Agupta is a genus of braconid wasps in the family Braconidae. There are at least four described species in Agupta, found in Malaysia.

Species
These four species belong to the genus Agupta:
 Agupta danyi Fernandez-Triana & Boudreault, 2018
 Agupta jeanphilippei Fernandez-Triana & Boudreault, 2018
 Agupta raymondi Fernandez-Triana & Boudreault, 2018
 Agupta solangeae Fernandez-Triana & Boudreault, 2018

References

Microgastrinae